Poppin' or Poppin may refer to:

Music
 [[Poppin' (album)|Poppin''' (album)]], a 1980 album recorded in 1957 by Hank Mobley, or the title song
 "Poppin'" (Chris Brown song), a 2005 single by Chris Brown
 "Poppin'", a 2009 song by Utada, from the album This Is the One "Poppin'", a 2015 song by Rico Richie produced by 808 Mafia
 "Poppin" (KSI song), a 2020 song by KSI featuring Lil Pump and Smokepurpp
 "Poppin", a 2022 song by Yeat from the album 2 AlivePeople
 Poppin' Hyun Joon, South Korean dancer, rapper and singer
 , reggae artist

Other uses
 Poppin' Fresh, Pillsbury mascot

See also
 "P-Poppin", 2003 single by Ludacris
 "Poppin' Them Thangs", 2003 single by G-Unit
 Popping, a dance style
 Popping (disambiguation)
 Poppins'', 2012 anthology film
 Poppen